Alexopoulos is a Greek patronymic surname meaning "son of Alexios". The female form of the surname is Alexopoulou (Αλεξοπούλου). Notable people with the surname include:

Alexios Alexopoulos (born 1971), Greek sprinter
Athina-Theodora Alexopoulou (born 1983), Greek sprint canoeist
Constantine John Alexopoulos (1907–1986), Greek-American mycologist
Georgios Alexopoulos (born 1977), Greek footballer
Heléne Alexopoulos, American ballet dancer

Greek-language surnames
Patronymic surnames